Ervin Demeter (born 21 December 1954) is a Hungarian politician, who served as Minister of Civilian Intelligence Services of Hungary between 2000 and 2002.

Personal life
He is married. His wife is Edit Kulcsár. They have a son, Endre.

References

 Biográf ki kicsoda (Budapest, 2003)
 Bölöny, József – Hubai, László: Magyarország kormányai 1848–2004 [Cabinets of Hungary 1848–2004], Akadémiai Kiadó, Budapest, 2004 (5th edition).

1954 births
Living people
Secret ministers of Hungary
Fidesz politicians
Members of the National Assembly of Hungary (1994–1998)
Members of the National Assembly of Hungary (2002–2006)
Members of the National Assembly of Hungary (2006–2010)
Members of the National Assembly of Hungary (2010–2014)